Olivier Bauer (born 28 February 1972) is a Swiss retired football defender who played in the early 1990s as defender.

Bauer played his youth football with local club FC Aesch. He advanced to their first team in the 1989–1990 season. Bauer then joined FC Basel's first team during the winter break of their 1990–91 season and signed his first professional contract under head-coach Ernst August Künnecke in the second tier of Swiss football. After playing in one test match, Bauer played his domestic league debut for his new club in the away game at the Espenmoos on 1 June 1991 as Basel were defeated 0–1 by St. Gallen.

Right from the beginning of the following season Bauer became a regular in the starting eleven. During Basel's 1993–94 season his team mates were the likes of Swiss international goalkeeper Stefan Huber, defenders Massimo Ceccaroni, Marco Walker and Samir Tabakovic, the midfielders Mario Cantaluppi, Martin Jeitziner, Admir Smajić and Ørjan Berg and the Swiss international striker Dario Zuffi. Together they won the promotion/relegation group and thus won promotion to the top flight of Swiss football, after six seasons in the second tier.

He was with the club for four seasons and during this time Bauer played a total of 95 games for Basel without scoring a goal. 65 of these games were in the Nationalliga A, seven in the Swiss Cup and 23 were friendly games.

In the winter break of the 1993–94 season Bauer left Basel moved on to play for local team BSC Old Boys.

References

Sources
 Die ersten 125 Jahre. Publisher: Josef Zindel im Friedrich Reinhardt Verlag, Basel. 
 Verein "Basler Fussballarchiv" Homepage

1972 births
Living people
Swiss men's footballers
FC Basel players
BSC Old Boys players
Association football defenders
Swiss Challenge League players